Moqua may refer to:

 Moqua Well
 Moqua Caves
 Chi qua, also known as moa qua or moa gua, a variety of winter melon (Benincasa hispida var. chieh-gua)